Raymond Paul Flaherty (September 1, 1903 – July 19, 1994) was an American football player and coach in the National Football League (NFL), and a member of the Pro Football Hall of Fame. He was part of three NFL Championship teams, one as a player and two as a head coach.

Early years
Born on a farm near Lamont in eastern Washington, Flaherty grew up in Spokane and was a multi-sport athlete at Gonzaga High School (now Gonzaga Prep) and Gonzaga University, where he played with Hust Stockton under head coach Gus Dorais. As a freshman, Flaherty attended Washington State College in Pullman, then transferred to Gonzaga before his sophomore year.

Pro football

Player
Flaherty began his professional football career in 1926 with the Los Angeles Wildcats of the American Football League, a team of western players based in Illinois. It played all its games on the road in its only season, which ended with a post-season barnstorming tour through the South against league rival New York Yankees. Flaherty then played in the National Football League (NFL) for eight seasons, first with the Yankees (1927–1928) with Red Grange, until the franchise folded following the 1928 season. He joined the New York Giants, 1929 through the 1935 season, except for 1930, when he returned to Spokane as the head coach at his alma mater, Gonzaga. He also coached the Bulldog basketball team for a season (1930–1931). At the end of the 1935 season, Flaherty's jersey number 1 was 'taken out of circulation', thus making Flaherty the first professional football player to have his number retired.

At age 26, Flaherty played a season of minor league baseball in 1930, as a second baseman with the Providence Grays of the Eastern League.

Head coach
Following his playing career, Flaherty was hired by George Preston Marshall, owner of the NFL's Boston Redskins, as head coach for the 1936 season. The team won the division title that year, then relocated to Washington, D.C. for the 1937 season, and picked up future hall of fame quarterback Sammy Baugh in the first round of the 1937 NFL draft. In seven seasons at the helm of the Redskins, Flaherty won four division titles and two NFL Championships (1937, 1942). Among his innovations on offense, Flaherty is credited with inventing the screen pass in 1937.

The Redskins held their 1940 training camp in Spokane at Gonzaga; the previous year's camp was also held in Spokane County, at Eastern Washington College in Cheney. In 1941 and 1942, the Redskins trained in California in San Diego at Brown Military Academy.

Flaherty served as an officer in the U.S. Navy during World War II, then returned to pro football in 1946 as a head coach in the new All-America Football Conference (AAFC). With the New York Yankees, he won division titles in each of his two full seasons at the helm, but lost to the Cleveland Browns in the title games. After a poor start in 1948, owner Dan Topping relieved Flaherty of his duties in mid-September. Several months later he was hired as head coach of the AAFC's Chicago Hornets, known as the Rockets in their three previous seasons. He was inducted into the Pro Football Hall of Fame in 1976 for his contributions as a coach.

After football
After the end of the AAFC in 1949, Flaherty returned to the Spokane area to enter private business as a beverage distributor, and lived in nearby northern Idaho. During football season, he was a part-time columnist for the Spokane Daily Chronicle. A college friend of Bing Crosby, Flaherty participated in the singer's Spokane memorial service in 1977.

After an extended illness, Flaherty died in 1994 in Hayden, Idaho at the age of 90; he and his wife Jackie (1921–2007) are buried at St. Thomas Cemetery in Coeur d'Alene.

Head coaching record

See also
 History of the New York Giants (1925–78)

References

External links
 
 
 
 

1903 births
1994 deaths
American football ends
Boston Redskins head coaches
Gonzaga Bulldogs football coaches
Gonzaga Bulldogs men's basketball coaches
Gonzaga Bulldogs football players
Gonzaga Preparatory School alumni
Gonzaga University alumni
New York Giants players
New York Yankees (NFL) players
Washington Redskins head coaches
Los Angeles Wildcats players
National Football League players with retired numbers
Pro Football Hall of Fame inductees
United States Navy personnel of World War II
Basketball coaches from Washington (state)
People from Whitman County, Washington
Players of American football from Spokane, Washington
United States Navy officers